Nebria piperi is a species of beetle from family Carabidae found in Canada and the US state of Washington.

Description and further distribution
The species is found in Tahoma River of Washington state.

References

piperi
Beetles described in 1925
Beetles of North America